Film Garden Entertainment, more commonly known as Film Garden, is a TV production company that produced TV programs for Discovery Health Channel (now Oprah Winfrey Network) and WE tv such as Platinum Weddings, which spawned a spin-off, Amazing Wedding Cakes and A Wedding Story. Film Garden Entertainment specializes in reality and documentary programs.

References
    

Television production companies of the United States